The 2003 International Formula 3000 season was the thirty-seventh season of the second-tier of Formula One feeder championship and also nineteenth season under the International Formula 3000 Championship moniker. It featured the 2003 FIA Formula 3000 International Championship with titles awarded for both Drivers and Teams. The championship was contested over ten events from 19 April to 13 September 2003. 

The Drivers Championship was won by Björn Wirdheim and the Teams Championship was awarded to Arden International Ltd.

Teams and drivers

The following teams and drivers contested the 2003 FIA Formula 3000 International Championship.

Calendar
The 2003 FIA Formula 3000 International Championship was contested over a ten event series.

Drivers' Championship

All drivers used Lola B02/50 chassis with Zytek-Judd KV engines and Avon tyres.
 Championship points were awarded on a 10-8-6-4-3-2-1 basis to the first eight finishers at each event. If two or more drivers had the same number of points (including 0 points), their positions in the Championship was fixed according to the quality of their places. Under this system one first place was better than any number of second places, one second place was better than any number of third places and so on.

Teams Championship
Points for the 2003 FIA Formula 300 International Championship for Teams were awarded on a 10-8-6-5-4-3-2-1 basis for the first eight places at each event. Results from both team cars were taken into account.

Complete Overview

R16=retired, but classified R=retired NS=did not start NT=no time set in qualifying 13E=grid position, but started from the end of the grid

See also
2003 Euro Formula 3000 season

References

Further reading
 Automobile Year, 2003/04

External links
 FIA F3000 Season Guide
 Barcelona testing images from www.motorsport.com

Formula 3000
International Formula 3000 seasons
Formula 3000